The izze-kloth or medicine cord is a sacred cord worn by Apache medicine men that is believed to confer strength and special powers of healing to the wearer. The izze-kloth is usually made from strands of animal hide and its length is punctuated with beads and shells. Often, an izze-kloth has four strands, each dyed a different color (usually, yellow, blue, white and black).

Etiquette
The izze-kloth holds great sacred symbolism and people regarded as unbelievers in the cord are almost never permitted to view, touch or discuss it. Nineteenth-century ethnological reports on Native American beliefs often commented on the difficulty in understanding the purpose and use of the izze-kloth because "the Apache look upon these cords as so sacred that strangers are not allowed to see them, much less handle them or talk about them."

See also
Apache
Medicine man
Yagyopavit, the Hindu sacred cord
Kushti, the Zoroastrian sacred cord

References

Apache culture
Native American culture
American Indian relics